Elaphrus americanus is a species of ground beetle in the subfamily Elaphrinae. It was described by Pierre François Marie Auguste Dejean in 1831.

References

Elaphrinae
Beetles described in 1831